Keith Sanderson (born February 2, 1975) is an American sport shooter who holds the Olympic record for the qualification round of 25 meter rapid fire pistol (583 points, set in 2008). After winning the qualification round, he fell back during the final and finished fifth, the same position he had reached in the 2006 World Championships. He has four medals from ISSF World Cups: a bronze from Munich 2007, a gold from Beijing 2009, where he defeated Vijay Kumar by 0.1 point in the final, another bronze from Munich 2009, and the gold from Fort Benning, Georgia where he won by 7 shots.

On the continental level, Sanderson has been successful in other events as well. At the Championship of the Americas held in Salinas, Puerto Rico in 2005, he won gold in 25 meter center-fire pistol and bronze in both 50 meter pistol and 25 meter standard pistol. He failed to place in rapid fire, but two years later, at the 2007 Pan American Games in Rio de Janeiro, he won the silver medal, defeated only by Cuba's Leuris Pupo.

Sanderson did not compete in the Tokyo Olympics in 2021, having been suspended by the United States Center for SafeSport.

SafeSport suspension
Sanderson was suspended indefinitely by USA Shooting for 17 violations of the Athlete Code of Conduct, and seven violations of the SafeSport policy. He did not compete in the Tokyo Olympics in 2021, having been indefinitely suspended by the U.S. Center for SafeSport earlier.

References

External links

Sanderson's profile at ISSF TV

1975 births
Living people
American male sport shooters
United States Army soldiers
United States Distinguished Marksman
ISSF pistol shooters
Shooters at the 2007 Pan American Games
Shooters at the 2008 Summer Olympics
Shooters at the 2012 Summer Olympics
Shooters at the 2016 Summer Olympics
Olympic shooters of the United States
Pan American Games silver medalists for the United States
Pan American Games medalists in shooting
Medalists at the 2007 Pan American Games
U.S. Army World Class Athlete Program